"Fool Me" is a song written by Joe South. South's version was released as a single in 1971 and peaked at number 78 on the Billboard Hot 100.

Lynn Anderson version
"Fool Me" was also recorded by American country music artist Lynn Anderson. Released in October 1972, it was the second single from her album Listen to a Country Song. The song peaked at number 4 on the Billboard Hot Country Singles chart. It also reached number 1 on the RPM Country Tracks chart in Canada.

Chart performance

Joe South

Lynn Anderson

References

1971 singles
1972 singles
Joe South songs
Lynn Anderson songs
Songs written by Joe South
Columbia Records singles
1971 songs
Song recordings produced by Glenn Sutton